Kheybar Rural District is a rural district (dehestan) in Choghamish District, Dezful County, Khuzestan Province, Iran. At the 2006 census, its population was 13,320, in 2,490 families.  The rural district has 14 villages.

References 

Rural Districts of Khuzestan Province
Dezful County